Eastcote is a London Underground station in Eastcote in the west of Greater London. The station is located on Field End Road. It is in Travelcard Zone 5.

History

At first, services were operated by steam trains, but track electrification was completed in the subsequent months and electric trains began operating on 1 January 1905.

Progressive development in the north Middlesex area over the next two decades lead to the gradual opening of additional stations along the Uxbridge branch to encourage the growth of new residential areas. Eastcote opened on 26 May 1906 as Eastcote Halt.

On 23 October 1933 District line services were replaced by Piccadilly line trains. The station was rebuilt between 1937 and 1939 to a design by Charles Holden which features the large cube-shaped brick and glass ticket hall capped with a flat reinforced concrete roof and geometrical forms typical of the new stations built in this period. The station buildings and platforms are Grade II listed.

The station is surrounded by the suburb of Eastcote; the original centre, now known as Old Eastcote is some distance away. The Cavendish Pavilion nearby was a popular destination for outings in the first part of the twentieth century.

Services

Metropolitan line 
The Metropolitan line is the only line to operate an express service, though currently for Metropolitan line trains on the Uxbridge branch this is eastbound only in the morning peaks (06:30 to 09:30) Monday to Friday.

The off-peak service in trains per hour (tph) is:
 8tph Eastbound to Aldgate via Baker Street (all stations)
 8tph Westbound to Uxbridge

The morning peak service in trains per hour (tph) is:
 2tph Eastbound to Aldgate via Baker Street (semi-fast)
 4tph Eastbound to Aldgate via Baker Street (all stations)
 4tph Eastbound to Baker Street (all stations)
 10tph Westbound to Uxbridge

The evening peak service in trains per hour (tph) is:
 7tph Eastbound to Aldgate via Baker Street (all stations)
 3tph Eastbound to Baker Street (all stations)
 10tph Westbound to Uxbridge

Piccadilly line

Between Rayners Lane and Uxbridge there is no Piccadilly Line service before approximately 06:30 (Monday - Friday) and 08:45 (Saturday - Sunday), except for one early morning
departure from Uxbridge at 05:18 (Monday - Saturday) and 06:46 (Sunday).

The off-peak service in trains per hour (tph) is:
 3tph Eastbound to Cockfosters
 3tph Westbound to Uxbridge

The peak time service in trains per hour (tph) is:
 6tph Eastbound to Cockfosters
 6tph Westbound to Uxbridge

Connections
London Buses routes 282 and 398 serve the station.

References

External links

 
 
 
  A group of children from the East End of London wait for a train to take them home from an excursion to the Pavilion.
 
 
 
 

Metropolitan line stations
Piccadilly line stations
Tube stations in the London Borough of Hillingdon
Former Metropolitan Railway stations
Railway stations in Great Britain opened in 1906
Charles Holden railway stations
Art Deco architecture in London
Grade II listed buildings in the London Borough of Hillingdon
Grade II listed railway stations
Tube station